The Bayer designations p Carinae and P Carinae are distinct.

for p Carinae, see PP Carinae
for P Carinae, see V399 Carinae

Carinae, p
Carina (constellation)